Alfred A. Loeb State Park is a state park in the U.S. state of Oregon, administered by the Oregon Parks and Recreation Department. Located on the banks of the Chetco River, the park offers camping, hiking, fishing, swimming, and rafting opportunities. In the parks boundaries are 3 rental cabins, 53 camping sites, a launch area for drift boats, a day-use area, and the head of a  trail that the official Web site says leads to northernmost coastal redwood grove in the United States.

See also
 List of Oregon state parks

References

External links
 
 

State parks of Oregon
Parks in Curry County, Oregon
Curry County, Oregon